The UK Rock & Metal Singles Chart is a record chart which ranks the best-selling rock and heavy metal songs in the United Kingdom. Compiled and published by the Official Charts Company, the data is based on each track's weekly physical sales, digital downloads and streams. In 2016, there were 14 singles that topped the 52 published charts. The first number-one single of the year was Motörhead's 1980 single "Ace of Spades", which spent the first three weeks atop the chart following the death of the band's frontman Lemmy Kilmister. The final number-one single of the year was the 2003 release "Christmas Time (Don't Let the Bells End)" by The Darkness, which reached number one for the week ending 22 December and remained there for three weeks into January 2017.

The most successful song on the UK Rock & Metal Singles Chart in 2016 was Disturbed's cover version of Simon & Garfunkel's "The Sound of Silence", which spent 17 weeks running atop the chart between 21 April and 21 August. "Can't Stop" by Red Hot Chili Peppers spent 14 weeks at number one in 2016, while Fall Out Boy were number one for five weeks during the year with two singles from the album American Beauty/American Psycho – "Centuries" for two weeks and "Irresistible" for three weeks. Motörhead, The Darkness and Biffy Clyro each spent three weeks at number one during the year, while two more singles – "Iris" by Goo Goo Dolls, "Sweet Child o' Mine" by Guns N' Roses spend two each in 2016.

Chart history

See also
2016 in British music
List of UK Rock & Metal Albums Chart number ones of 2016

References

External links
Official UK Rock & Metal Singles Chart Top 40 at the Official Charts Company
The Official UK Top 40 Rock Singles at BBC Radio 1

2016 in British music
United Kingdom Rock and Metal Singles
2016